Benjamin Simm (born 6 January 1986 in Hanover) is a German international rugby union player, playing for the DSV 78 Hannover in the Rugby-Bundesliga and the German national rugby union team. He made his debut for Germany in 2004.

His club, DSV 78/08 Ricklingen, won the 2nd Bundesliga title in 2008-09 and earned promotion to the Rugby-Bundesliga, now playing as DSV 78 Hannover.

Simm has also played for the Germany's 7's side in the past, like at the 2008 and 2009 Hannover Sevens and the 2006 and 2009 London Sevens.

Honours

Club
 2nd Bundesliga - North
 Champions: 2009

National team
 European Nations Cup - Division 2
 Champions: 2008

Stats
Benjamin Simm's personal statistics in club and international rugby:

Club

 As of 30 April 2012

National team

Friendlies & other competitions

 As of 8 April 2012

References

External links
 Benjamin Simm at scrum.com
   Benjamin Simm at totalrugby.de
  Benjamin Simm at the DRV website

1986 births
Living people
German rugby union players
Germany international rugby union players
DSV 78 Hannover players
Rugby union centres
Sportspeople from Hanover